Pulaski is an unincorporated community in Scott County, Mississippi, United States. Its ZIP code is 39152.

Notes

Unincorporated communities in Scott County, Mississippi
Unincorporated communities in Mississippi